Alston may refer to:

People
Alston (name)

Places

Australia
Alstonvale, New South Wales
Alstonville, New South Wales

Canada
Alstonvale, Quebec

England
Alston, Cumbria
Alston, East Devon, Devon
Alston, South Hams, in Malborough, Devon 
Alston, Lancashire, formerly in the Amounderness registration district
Alston, Suffolk

United States
Alston, Georgia
Alston, Michigan
Alston, Oregon
Alston, South Carolina
Dresser, California, formerly Alston

See also
National Collegiate Athletic Association v. Alston, 2021 United States Supreme Court decision
Alliston
Allston
Alstone (disambiguation)